Two Medicine Store, formerly part of Two Medicine Chalets, is a historic building in Glacier National Park in the U.S. state of Montana.  The chalet was originally built in 1914 by the Glacier Park Hotel Company, a subsidiary of the Great Northern Railway, as part of the railway's extensive program of visitor services development at Glacier.  The chalet group originally featured a complex of log buildings, all built in the rustic style, which provided dining and lodging facilities.   Overnight accommodations at the chalet ended with the onset of World War II, and the other buildings at the site were intentionally burned in 1956.

President Franklin D. Roosevelt gave a national radio address from Two Medicine Chalets on August 5, 1934, while on a visit to Glacier.

The Two Medicine Store is a National Historic Landmark contributing property, being one of five sites in the Great Northern Railway Buildings National Historic Landmark.  While other chalets, Granite Park Chalet and Sperry Chalet, were constructed of stone, the Two Medicine Chalet complex was of log construction.

References

External links
 
 

Commercial buildings on the National Register of Historic Places in Montana
National Historic Landmarks in Montana
Great Northern Railway (U.S.)
Commercial buildings completed in 1914
Rustic architecture in Montana
Historic district contributing properties in Montana
National Register of Historic Places in Glacier County, Montana
1914 establishments in Montana
National Register of Historic Places in Glacier National Park
Log buildings and structures on the National Register of Historic Places in Montana